David Michael Grimes (born December 31, 1986) is a former American football wide receiver. Grimes played wide receiver for Notre Dame. He is currently assistant strength and conditioning coach at the University of Notre Dame.

Early life
David attended St. Martin de Porres High School in Detroit, Michigan. David graduated at the top of his class, earning valedictorian distinction for the class of 2005.

College career
As a freshman, Grimes Played in all 12 games, primarily on special teams, and won a monogram. He also emerged as Notre Dame's top kickoff return man.  As a sophomore, Grimes served as the 3rd receiver in a rotation with Jeff Samardzija and Rhema McKnight. As a junior, Grimes missed a few games with injury, but otherwise, he was a starter and one of the team's leading receivers. Grimes was elected team captain for the 2008 season along with Maurice Crum Jr. and David Bruton.

Professional career
Grimes signed with the Denver Broncos as an undrafted free agent, but was later released by the team on July 23, 2009.

On May 4, 2010 David Grimes signed with the Kansas City Chiefs. He was later waived on July 31, 2010

References

External links
 Notre Dame Fighting Irish bio

1986 births
Living people
Notre Dame Fighting Irish football players
Players of American football from Detroit
Players of American football from Los Angeles
Saint Martin de Porres High School (Detroit) alumni